Natalia Molebatsi is a South African writer, poet, performer, editor, and cultural organizer.

Biography
Natalia Molebatsi was born and raised in the township of Tembisa, near Johannesburg in South Africa.

She is a Pan-African queer feminist poet, writer, and performer. She is the author of two poetry collections, Sardo Dance and Elephant Woman Song, and the editor of We Are: A Poetry Anthology and Wild Imperfections: An Anthology of Womanist Poems.  She is a founding member of the band Soul Making, and in 2015 her CD Natalia Molebatsi & The Soul Making was released. 

Her work is included in Letter to South Africa: Poets Calling the State to Order, Happiness the Delight-Tree: An Anthology of Contemporary International Poetry, New Coin, the Anthology of World Poetry (2010), and New Daughters of Africa (2019, edited by Margaret Busby), among other publications. Her prose writing has appeared in academic literary journals, such as Muziki, Agenda Feminist Media and Sasinda Futhi Siselapha: Black Feminist Approaches to Cultural Studies In South Africa’s Twenty-Five Years Since 1994.

Molebatsi has performed poetry and facilitated creative writing workshops internationally, including at universities and festivals in Nigeria, Senegal, Kenya, Zimbabwe, England, Italy, Azerbaijan, Argentina, China, Palestine and Germany. Among notable events where she has participated are the Yari Yari Ntoaso women's conference in Ghana, the Aké Arts and Book Festival in Abeokuta and the Lagos International Poetry Festival.

Further reading
 Khatija Bibi Khan, "The creative visions of Natalia Molebatsi in post-1994 South Africa, in Sardo Dance (2009)", Commonwealth Youth and Development, Volume 11, Issue 1, January 2013, pp. 87–101.
 Natalia Molebatsi; T Tu Huynh, "Our World through Our Words: the People and Their Stories through Our Ancestors’ Voices"

 Natalia Molebatsi, "Affirming Our Memories: Experiences and realities of feminist poets through the radio", July 2019, Agenda 33(4):1–11.

References

External links
 Natalia Molebatsi's website
 "Natalia Molebatsi - Unisa Poetry Sessions", 13 May 2015. YouTube video.

Living people
21st-century poets
21st-century South African women writers
South African performance artists
Spoken word poets
Year of birth missing (living people)